Bruin, (from Dutch for "brown"), is an English folk term for brown bear.

Bruin, Bruins or BRUIN may also refer to:

Places
 Lake Bruin, ox-bow lake of the Mississippi River located in northeastern Louisiana
 Lake Bruin State Park
 Bruin, Kentucky, United States
 Bruin, Pennsylvania, United States
 Bruin's Slave Jail, building in Alexandria, Virginia

Sports team nicknames and mascots
 Ayr Bruins, a defunct Scottish ice hockey team
 Bellevue University, Bellevue, Nebraska
 Belmont University, Nashville, Tennessee
 Bob Jones University, Greenville, South Carolina
 Boston Bruins, an American NHL hockey team
 UCLA Bruins, a collegiate sports team located in Los Angeles, California
 Chilliwack Bruins, a former Canadian major junior ice hockey team in Chilliwack, British Columbia
 George Fox University, Newberg, Oregon
 Kellogg Community College, Battle Creek, Michigan
 New Westminster Bruins, a former Canadian major junior ice hockey team in New Westminster, British Columbia
 Piedmont International University, Winston-Salem, North Carolina
 Providence Bruins, an American AHL hockey team in Providence, Rhode Island
 Salt Lake Community College, Salt Lake County, Utah

Other uses
 Bruin (surname)
 Oud bruin, Belgian beer
 Heineken Oud Bruin, Dutch beer
 Yamaha Bruin 350, utility all-terrain vehicle
 Brown University Interactive Language, a programming language
 Rasmus Klump, a comic strip published as Bruin
 Bruin, a brown bear in the Reynard cycle fables

See also
 List of Bruin mascots
 Ursidae